Hamad Al-Juhaini (Arabic:حمد الجهيني) (born 26 September 1990) is a Qatari footballer.

References

External links
 

Qatari footballers
1990 births
Living people
Al-Shahania SC players
Qatar Stars League players
Qatari Second Division players
Association football wingers